Wallace's Cave in the Lugar Gorge at Auchinleck in the Parish of Auchinleck is an 18th-century grotto contemporary with Dr Johnson's Summerhouse, also located on the Auchinleck Estate. It shows superior workmanship in its construction, possibly being the enlargement of a pre-existing cave. The cave or grotto lies downstream of the confluence of the Dippol Burn with the River Lugar and is reached via a once well formed path, however access is now hazardous due to the condition of the cliff edge path and the vertical drop into the River Lugar.

Cave and access

The cave is a Category B Listed Building that is reached via a narrow path and some rock cut steps that follow the River Lugar gorge. Lying within a side gorge cut by a small burn the final approach requires the crossing of the burn. The masons chisel marks are very clear on the walls and their work created a chamber with a floor area of approximately 14 square feet with prominent rib vaults that rise from the four corners meeting at the central roof apex, thus creating the impression, deliberately or not, of a cross or Saltire. The cave height is approximately ten feet and access is via a pointed seven foot high arched doorway, now minus its door, with one small, similarly shaped window to left as seen from the outside. The window shows no obvious sign of having been glazed.

The eminent antiquarian John Smith visited the area circa 1895 recording historic sites but makes no reference to the two caves on the estate. It has been suggested that this or a previous cave dates from the late 13th or 14th century. Warrick, writing in 1899, makes no reference to Wallace's Cave at this site although he mentions one near Lugar in the Cubs' Glen on the Glenmuir Water.

John Thomson's map of 1832 does not mark the cave however the natural feature Kemp's Castle and the ruins of Ochiltree Castle and Auchinleck Castle are shown. The 1857 OS map shows a path leading to the site with no cave indicated, however by 1896 it is recorded. The 1908 map records the cave however the access path is no longer shown.

Other Wallace's Cave sites
A Wallace's Cave or Hawthornden Castle Cave exists in Roslin Glen, in Midlothian. Hawthornden Castle stands nearby and the patriot took part in the Battle of Rosslyn on 24 February 1303.

A Wallace's Cave was located in Bothwell Parish on the South Calder Water, Lanarkshire, to the west of Cleland and close to the site of the old Ravenscraig Steelworks.

Crawhill in Lothian has a Wallace's Cave that is said to have been used by him after the Battle of Falkirk.

The River Clyde has an example at Corra Linn near New Lanark, Lanarkshire.

On the opposite side of the River Ayr from Wallace's Heel Well a Wallace's Cave was located and it is said that William Wallace used it to hide from English troops. No sign of it remains.

A natural cave in the Cartland Craigs (NS 8691 4454) ravine in South Lanarkshire is locally said to have been used as a refuge by William Wallace.

Tradition identifies a Wallace's Cave located at a rock shelter near Lugar in the Cubs' Glen on the Glenmuir Water.

History

It has been estimated as dating from circa 1760 and has been hewn from soft red sandstone in the Gothic style as a man-made folly or grotto, although the possibility remains that it was an extension of a natural cave. The RCAHMS Canmore site classifies the site as post-medieval and holds no details of the grotto. The original Auchinleck Castle stands upstream of the cave just above the confluence of the Dippol Burn with the River Lugar.

It was common practice during times of war or unrest to hide valuables, charters, etc. in safe locations and it is possible that Wallace's Cave may have been first made for this purpose as was the case with Bruce's Cave at Kirkpatrick Fleming.

The first Laird of Auchinleck or Affleck on record was Nicol de Achethlec or Achethlic who was a great supporter of Scottish independence and is said to have been related to Sir William Wallace.

It is known that Nicol rode with Wallace to Glasgow where the English soldiers were defeated at the 'Battle of the Bell of the Brae'. It has been surmised that the grotto's name patriotically commemorates the romantic Boswell family association with the national hero and that it is contemporary with the surviving Gothic grotto variously known as Dr Johnson's Summerhouse, 'Boswell's Summerhouse' situated further upstream on the Dippol Burn near the Ten Shillings Bridge, making two grottoes hewn in the picturesque landscape circa 1760 to enhance the new Auchinleck House and pleasure gardens.

Micro-history
A visitor to one of the caves in circa 1947 describes a walk that takes him to "a staircase of broad wooden steps built into the steep bank, but so deep in leaves that the stepping places were hard to distinguish. It led down to the water's edge, and gave access to a large cave hewn in the solid rock. A fine dry apartment it was, and to sit on the carved ledge and watch the wagtails dipping from stone to stone, the burn clear as a sheet of crystal, was most restful." This may refer to the summerhouse named in Dr Samuel Johnson's honour.

See also

Bickering Bush
Cleeves Cove
Dunton Cove
The Holy Cave, Hunterston
Peden's Cave (Auchinbay)

References
Notes

External links
Wallace's Cave, Lugar Gorge, Auchinleck.
Samuel Johnson's Summerhouse Cave.
Auchinleck Ice House, Dippol Burn.
Wallace's Cave, Armadale.
Wallace's Cave, Roslin

Caves of Scotland
Protected areas of East Ayrshire
Landforms of East Ayrshire
18th century in Scotland